DN6 is a national road in Romania which links Bucharest with the Banat region in the western part of the country and further to the East-European capitals Budapest and Belgrade via the border with Hungary near Cenad. It is a very traveled road.

The national road passes through the following municipalities: Alexandria, Caracal, Craiova, Drobeta-Turnu Severin, Caransebeș, Lugoj and Timișoara. Near Gura Văii the road is linked by the road  to the Serbian road network via a dam on the Danube (Porțile de Fier I).

References

Roads in Romania